The Extra Element Theorem (EET) is an analytic technique developed by R. D. Middlebrook for simplifying the process of deriving driving point and transfer functions for linear electronic circuits. Much like Thévenin's theorem, the extra element theorem breaks down one complicated problem into several simpler ones.

Driving point and transfer functions can generally be found using Kirchhoff's circuit laws.  However several complicated equations may result that offer little insight into the circuit's behavior. Using the extra element theorem, a circuit element (such as a resistor) can be removed from a circuit and the desired driving point or transfer function found. By removing the element that most complicates the circuit (such as an element that creates feedback), the desired function can be easier to obtain. Next two correctional factors must be found and combined with the previously derived function to find the exact expression.

The general form of the extra element theorem is called the N-extra element theorem and allows multiple circuit elements to be removed at once.

General formulation
The (single) extra element theorem expresses any transfer function as a product of the transfer function with that element removed and a correction factor. The correction factor term consists of the impedance of the extra element and two driving point impedances seen by the extra element: The double null injection driving point impedance and the single injection driving point impedance. Because an extra element can be removed in general by either short-circuiting or open-circuiting the element, there are two equivalent forms of the EET:

or,

Where the Laplace-domain transfer functions and impedances in the above expressions are defined as follows:  is the transfer function with the extra element present.  is the transfer function with the extra element open-circuited.  is the transfer function with the extra element short-circuited.  is the impedance of the extra element.  is the single-injection driving point impedance "seen" by the extra element.  is the double-null-injection driving point impedance "seen" by the extra element.

The extra element theorem incidentally proves that any electric circuit transfer function can be expressed as no more than a bilinear function of any particular circuit element.

Driving point impedances

Single Injection Driving Point Impedance
 is found by making the input to the system's transfer function zero (short circuit a voltage source or open circuit a current source) and determining the impedance across the terminals to which the extra element will be connected with the extra element absent. This impedance is same as the Thévenin's equivalent impedance.

Double Null Injection Driving Point Impedance
 is found by replacing the extra element with a second test signal source (either current source or voltage source as appropriate). Then,  is defined as the ratio of voltage across the terminals of this second test source to the current leaving its positive terminal when the output of the system's transfer function is nulled for any value of the primary input to the system's transfer function.

In practice,  can be found from working backwards from the facts that the output of the transfer function is made zero and that the primary input to the transfer function is unknown. Then using conventional circuit analysis techniques to express both the voltage across the extra element test source's terminals, and the current leaving the extra element test source's positive terminals, and calculating .

Special case with transfer function as a self-impedance
As a special case, the EET can be used to find the input impedance of a network with the addition of an element designated as "extra". In this case,  is same as the impedance of the input test current source signal made zero or equivalently with the input open circuited. Likewise, since the transfer function output signal can be considered to be the voltage at the input terminals,  is found when the input voltage is zero i.e. the input terminals are short-circuited. Thus, for this particular application the EET can be written as:

where
 is the impedance chosen as the extra element
 is the input impedance with Z removed (or made infinite)
 is the impedance seen by the extra element Z with the input shorted (or made zero)
 is the impedance seen by the extra element Z with the input open (or made infinite)

Computing these three terms may seem like extra effort, but they are often easier to compute than the overall input impedance.

Example

Consider the problem of finding  for the circuit in Figure 1 using the EET (note all component values are unity for simplicity). If the capacitor (gray shading) is denoted the extra element then

Removing this capacitor from the circuit,

Calculating the impedance seen by the capacitor with the input shorted,

Calculating the impedance seen by the capacitor with the input open,

Therefore, using the EET,

This problem was solved by calculating three simple driving point impedances by inspection.

Feedback amplifiers
The EET is also useful for analyzing single and multi-loop feedback amplifiers. In this case the EET can take the form of the asymptotic gain model.

See also
Asymptotic gain model
Blackman's theorem
Return ratio
Signal-flow graph

Further reading

Christophe Basso Linear Circuit Transfer Functions: An Introduction to Fast Analytical Techniques first edition, Wiley, IEEE Press, 2016, 978-1119236375

References

External links
Examples of applying the EET
Derivation and examples
Fast Analytical Techniques at Work in Small-Signal Modeling

Circuit theorems